Intel Arc is a brand of graphics processing units designed by Intel. These are discrete GPUs mostly marketed for the high-margin PC gaming market. The brand also covers Intel's consumer graphics software and services.

Intel Arc is competing with Nvidia's GeForce and AMD's Radeon lines. The Arc-A series for laptops was launched on March 30, 2022, with the Arc 5 and 7 "set to arrive later this year in 'early summer. Intel missed their initial Q2 2022 release target, with most discrete Arc GPUs not launching until October 2022.

Intel officially launched the Arc Pro workstation GPUs on August 8, 2022.

Etymology 
According to Intel, the brand is named after the concept of story arcs found in video games. Each generation of Arc is named after each letter of the Latin alphabet in ascending order, beginning with A, then B, then C, and so on. The first generation is named Alchemist, while Battlemage, Celestial and Druid are the respective names for the second, third and fourth Arc generations.

Graphics processor generations

Alchemist 

Developed under the previous codename "DG2", the first generation of Intel Arc GPUs (codenamed "Alchemist") released on March 30, 2022. It will come in both add-on desktop card and laptop form factors. TSMC manufactures the die, using their N6 process.

Alchemist uses the Intel Xe GPU architecture, or more specifically, the Xe-HPG variant. Alchemist supports hardware-based ray tracing, XeSS or supersampling based on neural networks (similar to Nvidia's DLSS), and DirectX 12 Ultimate. Also supported is DisplayPort 2.0 and overclocking. AV1 fixed-function hardware encoder is included in Alchemist GPUs as part of the Intel Quick Sync Video core.

Intel confirmed ASTC support has been removed from hardware starting with Alchemist and future Intel Arc GPU microarchitectures will also not support it.

Intel Arc Alchemist does not support SR-IOV. Intel Arc Alchemist does not support Direct3D 9 natively, instead falling back on the D3D9On12 wrapper which translates Direct3D 9 calls to their Direct3D 12 equivalents.

Intel Arc support OpenCL 3.0 for example, this GPU can work in the grid World Community Grid.

Desktop

Mobile

Workstation

Future generations 
Intel also revealed future generations of Intel Arc GPUs under development: Battlemage (based on Xe2), Celestial (based on Xe3), and Druid. Battlemage will succeed Alchemist.

Intel revealed that Meteor Lake and later generations of CPU SoCs will use an Intel Arc Tile GPU.<

Intel XeSS 
Intel XeSS is a real-time deep learning image upsampling technology developed primarily for use in video games as a competitor to Nvidia's DLSS and AMD's FSR technologies. Additionally, XeSS is not restricted to Intel Arc graphics cards. It does utilize XMX instructions exclusive to Intel Arc graphics cards, but will fall back to utilizing DP4a instructions on competing GPUs that have support for DP4a instructions. XeSS is trained with 64 samples per pixel as opposed to Nvidia DLSS's 16 samples per pixel (16K reference images).

Quality presets

Issues

Drivers 
Performance on Intel Arc GPUs has suffered from poor driver support, particularly at launch. An investigation by Gamers Nexus discovered 43 known driver issues with Arc GPUs, prompting a response and acknowledgement of the issues from Intel. Intel CEO Pat Gelsinger also blamed driver problems as a reason for Arc's delayed launch.

A beta driver from October 2022 accidentally reduced the memory clock by 9% on the Arc A770 from 2187MHz to 2000MHz, resulting in a 17% reduction in memory bandwidth. This particular issue was later fixed.

Intel provides an open source driver for Linux too.

DirectX 9 compatibility 
Officially, Intel Arc only supports the DirectX 11, DirectX 12 and Vulkan APIs in games. As a result, Arc GPUs perform worse in older games that are based exclusively on DirectX 9 such as CS:GO, League of Legends and StarCraft II when compared to similar GPUs from Nvidia and AMD. There is also a performance gap between DirectX 11 and DirectX 12.

A December 2022 driver update improved Arc compatibility and performance with DirectX 9-based games. According to Intel, the driver update made Arc GPUs up to 1.8x faster in DirectX 9 games.

A February 2023 driver update further improved Intel Arc's performance on DX9 based games.

References

External links 
 Official website
 Intel Graphics Performance Analyzers 2022.4

Computer-related introductions in 2022
Graphics processing units
Graphics cards
Intel graphics